OurColony is a search opera type alternate reality game and a viral marketing campaign for the marketing of a successor to the Microsoft Xbox. The game asks players to form colonies and earn points by completing various tasks. This use of an ARG is similar to I Love Bees, which was a viral marketing campaign for the Xbox game Halo 2 and another recent ARG for the Xbox 360 game Halo 3.

Brief history
On 14 March 2005, emails were sent to members of the ARG community, from someone named Gamem8ker, with a link to an image. On the main page of the site were instructions to submit 36 images, as well as a strange series of letter combinations. It was explained that "when the right 36 pictures are sent to me, the real game begins." The letter combinations turned out to be the codes of international airports.

OurColony hit a larger gamer audience 6 April after an article was published on GameSpot. This caused major headaches as servers became overloaded and the error message "The colony is quickly growing. Please be patient." became common. With this influx of users came rumors of hacking, cheating and spies.

Initially OurColony's general forums were set up to allow any user to delete any post or thread, making it almost impossible for people to have steady and meaningful communications. This led many players to create forums outside the official site where communication could continue without disruption. The site's general and colony forums were eventually removed.

The game progressed from the first stage, chaos, to the second and final stage, truth; gameplay between the two stages was identical.

The end of OurColony came with the release of a video showing J. Allard of Microsoft showing off the Xbox 360 console. At the end of the video, all participating colonies were listed on a final scroll in the credits, with top-scoring colonies first. The site is not owned by Microsoft any longer.

External links

Official

gamem8ker blog Gamem8ker's blog at blogspot.com.

Press coverage
The article also discusses other ARGs and the links between Ourcolony.net and Haunted Apiary.

Promotional alternate reality games
Xbox 360